Javier Vargas Rueda (born 22 November 1941) is a Mexican former football goalkeeper who played for Mexico in the 1962 FIFA World Cup. He also played for Club Atlas.

References

External links
FIFA profile

1941 births
Mexican footballers
Mexico international footballers
Association football goalkeepers
Atlas F.C. footballers
1966 FIFA World Cup players
Footballers at the 1968 Summer Olympics
Olympic footballers of Mexico
Liga MX players
Living people
Pan American Games medalists in football
Pan American Games gold medalists for Mexico
Footballers at the 1967 Pan American Games
Medalists at the 1967 Pan American Games